William V may refer to:

William V, Duke of Aquitaine (969–1030)
William V of Montpellier (1075–1121)
William V, Marquess of Montferrat (1191)
William V, Count of Nevers (before 11751181)
William V, Duke of Jülich (1299–1361)
William V, Count of Holland (1330–1389)
William V of Jülich-Berg (1516–1592)
William V, Duke of Bavaria (1548–1626)
William V, Landgrave of Hesse-Kassel (1602–1637)
William V, Prince of Orange (1748–1806)

See also
Guillaume, Hereditary Grand Duke of Luxembourg (born 1981), possible future regnal name
William, Prince of Wales (born 1982), possible future regnal name